Robert Julius Beyschlag (1838–1903) was a German painter.

Life 
Robert Julius Beyschlag was born in Nördlingen on 1 July 1838. He studied at the Akademie der Bildenden Künste, Munich. He was a painter of mythological subjects, figures, and genre scenes. His works include: Nymphs; Conversation at the Well; Iphigenia's Farewell; The Parting of Orpheus and Eurydice; and studies of women's heads and figures from different centuries, which were published as collotypes in 1885 under the title Frauenlob. He also painted a fresco in the Bayerisches Nationalmuseum, Munich. He died in Munich on 15 December 1903, aged 65.

Gallery

References

Sources 

 Wiench, Peter (2021). "Beyschlag, Robert Julius". In Beyer, Andreas; Savoy, Bénédicte; Tegethoff, Wolf (eds.). Allgemeines Künstlerlexikon - Internationale Künstlerdatenbank - Online. K. G. Saur. Retrieved 10 October 2022.
 "Beyschlag, Robert". Benezit Dictionary of Artists. 2011. Oxford Art Online. Retrieved 10 October 2022.

Further reading 

 Holland, Hyacinth (1909). "Beyschlag, Robert". In Thieme, Ulrich; Becker, Felix (eds.). Allgemeines Lexikon der Bildenden Künstler von der Antike bis zur Gegenwart. Vol. 3: Bassano–Bickham. Leipzig: Wilhelm Engelmann. p. 573.
 Horst, Ludwig, ed. (1981). "Beyschlag, Robert". In Bruckmanns Lexikon der Münchner Kunst. Münchner Maler im 19./20. Jahrhundert. Vol. 1. Munich: F. Bruckmann. p. 96.
 Meissner, Günter, ed. (1994). "Robert Beyschlag". In Allgemeines Künstlerlexikon. Die Bildenden Künstler aller Zeiten und Völker (AKL). Vol 10. Munich: K. G. Saur. p. 354. . 

1838 births
1903 deaths
19th-century German painters
People from Nördlingen
Artists from Bavaria